In Western Christian theology, grace is created by God who gives it as help to one because God desires one to have it, not necessarily because of anything one has done to earn it. It is understood by Western Christians to be a spontaneous gift from God to people – "generous, free and totally unexpected and undeserved" – that takes the form of divine favor, love, clemency, and a share in the divine life of God. In the Eastern Orthodox Church, grace is the uncreated Energies of God. Among Eastern Christians generally, grace is considered to be the partaking of the Divine Nature described in 2 Peter 1:4 and grace is the working of God himself, not a created substance of any kind that can be treated like a commodity.

As an attribute of God it manifests most in the salvation of sinners and Western Christianity holds that the initiative in the relationship of grace between God and an individual is always on the side of God.

The question of the means of grace has been called "the watershed that divides Catholicism from Protestantism, Calvinism from Arminianism, modern theological liberalism from theological conservatism." The Catholic Church holds that it is because of the action of Christ and the Holy Spirit in transforming into the divine life what is subjected to God's power that "the sacraments confer the grace they signify": "the power of Christ and his Spirit acts in and through [each sacrament], independently of the personal holiness of the minister. Nevertheless, the fruits of the sacraments also depend on the disposition of the one who receives them." The Sacred Mysteries (sacraments) are seen as a means of partaking of divine grace because God works through his Church. Catholics, Eastern Orthodox and Protestants agree that faith is a gift from God, as in Ephesians 2:8: "For by grace you have been saved through faith, and that not of yourselves; it is the gift of God." Lutherans hold that the means of grace are "the gospel in Word and sacraments." That the sacraments are means of grace is also the teaching of John Wesley, who described the Eucharist as "the grand channel whereby the grace of his Spirit was conveyed to the souls of all the children of God". Calvinists emphasize "the utter helplessness of people apart from grace." But God reaches out with "first grace" or "prevenient grace". The Calvinist doctrine known as irresistible grace states that, since all persons are by nature spiritually dead, no one desires to accept this grace until God spiritually enlivens them by means of regeneration. God regenerates only individuals whom he has predestined to salvation. Arminians understand the grace of God as cooperating with one's free will in order to bring an individual to salvation. According to Evangelical theologian Charles C. Ryrie, modern liberal theology "gives an exaggerated place to the abilities of people to decide their own fate and to effect their own salvation entirely apart from God's grace."

Old and New Testaments of the Christian Bible
Grace is the English translation of the Greek  meaning "that which brings delight, joy, happiness, or good fortune."

Old Testament 
The Septuagint translates as  the Hebrew word  as found in Genesis 6:8 to describe why God saved Noah from the flood. The Old Testament use of the word includes the concept that those showing favor do gracious deeds, or acts of grace, such as being kind to the poor and showing generosity. Descriptions of God's graciousness abound in the Torah/Pentateuch, for example in Deuteronomy 7:8 and Numbers 6:24–27. In the Psalms, examples of God's grace include teaching the Law (Psalm 119:29) and answering prayers (Psalm 27:7). Another example of God's grace appears in Psalm 85, a prayer for restoration, forgiveness, and the grace and mercy of God to bring about new life following the Exile.

Roman Catholicism
In the definition of the Catechism of the Catholic Church, "grace is favour, the free and undeserved help that God gives us to respond to his call to become children of God, adoptive sons, partakers of the divine nature and of eternal life". Grace is a participation in the life of God, which is poured unearned into human beings, whom it heals of sin and sanctifies.

The means by which God grants grace are many. They include the entirety of revealed truth, the sacraments and the hierarchical ministry. Among the principal means of grace are the sacraments (especially the Eucharist), prayers and good works. The sacramentals also are means of grace. The sacraments themselves, not the persons who administer or those who receive them, are "the means of grace", although lack of the required dispositions on the part of the recipient will block the effectiveness of the sacrament.

The Catholic Church holds that "by grace alone, in faith in Christ's saving work and not because of any merit on our part, we are accepted by God and receive the Holy Spirit, who renews our hearts while equipping and calling us to good works." Both the Council of Orange (529) and the Council of Trent affirmed that we are "justified gratuitously, because none of the things that precede justification, whether faith or works, merit the grace of justification".

The Council of Trent declared that the free will of man, moved and excited by God, can by its consent co-operate with God, who excites and invites its action; and that it can thereby dispose and prepare itself to obtain the grace of justification. The will can resist grace if it chooses. It is not like a lifeless thing, which remains purely passive. Weakened and diminished by Adam's fall, free will is yet not destroyed in the race (Sess. VI, cap. i and v).

The joint declaration between Catholics and Lutherans on the doctrine of justification affirms:

Sanctifying and actual grace
According to a commonly accepted categorization, made by St. Thomas Aquinas in his , grace can be given either to make the person receiving it pleasing to God – so that the person is sanctified and justified – or else to help the receiver lead someone else to God. The former type of grace, in turn, can be described as sanctifying (or habitual) grace – when it refers to the divine life which, according to the Church, infuses a person's soul once they are justified; or else as actual grace – when it refers to those punctual (not habitual) helps that are directed to the production of sanctifying grace where it does not already exist, or its maintenance and increase it where it is already present. According to the Catechism of the Catholic Church:

The infusion of sanctifying grace, says the Church, transforms a sinner into a holy child of God, and in this way a person participates in the Divine Sonship of Jesus Christ and receives the indwelling of the Holy Spirit. Sanctifying grace remains permanently in the soul as long as one does not reject one's adopted sonship by committing a mortal sin, which severs one's friendship with God. Less serious sins, venial sin, although they "allow charity to subsist, they offend and wound it." However, God is infinitely merciful, and sanctifying grace can always be restored to the penitent heart, normatively in the Sacrament of Reconciliation (or Sacrament of Penance).

Augustine versus Pelagius

In the early 5th century, Pelagius, an ascetic who is said to have come from Britain, was concerned about the moral laxity of society that he witnessed in Rome. He blamed this laxity on the theology of divine grace preached by Augustine of Hippo, among others. He strongly affirmed that humans had free will and were able to choose good as well as evil. Augustine, drawing on the exaggerated statements of the followers of Pelagius rather than on Pelagius' own writings, began a debate that was to have long-reaching effects on subsequent developments of the doctrine in Western Christianity. Pelagianism was repudiated by the Council of Carthage in 418, largely at Augustine's insistence. However, what Pelagius taught was likely what has come to be called semi-pelagianism.

In semi-Pelagian thought, both God and the human person always participate in the salvation process. Humans make free will choices, which are aided by God through creation, natural grace, "supernatural" grace, and God's restrictions on demonic influences. God continually brings the human person to real choices, which God also aids, in the process of spiritual growth and salvation. Semi-Pelagianism is similar to synergism, which is the traditional patristic doctrine. John Cassian, in continuity with patristic doctrine, taught that though grace is required for persons to save themselves at the beginning, there is no such thing as total depravity, but there remains a moral or noetic ability within humans that is unaffected by original sin, and that persons must work together (synergism) with divine grace to be saved. This position is held by the Eastern Orthodox Church and by many Reformed Protestants, and in the Catholic Church has been especially associated with the Society of Jesus.

Catholic versus Protestant
In 1547, the Council of Trent, which sought to address and condemn Protestant objections, aimed to purge the Roman Catholic Church of controversial movements and establish an orthodox Roman Catholic teaching on grace and justification, as distinguished from the Protestant teachings on those concepts. It taught that justification and sanctification are elements of the same process. The grace of justification is bestowed through the merit of Christ's passion, without any merits on the part of the person justified, who is enabled to cooperate only through the grace of God. The grace of justification may be lost through mortal sin, but can also be restored by the sacrament of Penance. The sacraments are, together with revealed truth, the principal means of the grace, a treasury of grace, that Christ has merited by his life and death and has given to the Church. This does not mean that other groups of Christians have no treasury of grace at their disposal, for, as the Second Vatican Council declared, "many elements of sanctification and of truth are found outside of (the Catholic Church's) visible structure".

Jansenists versus Jesuits
At about the same time that Calvinists and Arminians were debating the meaning of grace in Protestantism, in Catholicism a similar debate was taking place between the Jansenists and the Jesuits. Cornelius Jansen's 1640 work  sought to refocus Catholic theology on the themes of original sin, human depravity, the necessity of divine grace, and predestination, as he found them in the works of Augustine. The Jansenists, like the Puritans, believed themselves to be members of a gathered church called out of worldly society, and banded together in institutions like the Port-Royal convents seeking to lead lives of greater spiritual intensity. Blaise Pascal attacked what he called moral laxity in the casuistry of the Jesuits. Jansenist theology remained a minority party within Catholicism, and during the second half of the 17th and 18th centuries it was condemned as a heresy for its similarities to Calvinism, though its style remained influential in ascetic circles.

Grace and merit 

Citing the Council of Trent, the Catechism of the Catholic Church states:

Eastern Christianity

In the Eastern Orthodox Church, grace is identified with the uncreated Energies of God. Among Eastern Christians generally, grace is considered to be the partaking of the Divine Nature described in 2 Peter 1:4. The Holy Mysteries (Latin, "sacraments") are seen as a means of partaking of divine grace because God works through his Church, not just because specific legalistic rules are followed; and grace is the working of God himself, not a created substance of any kind that can be treated like a commodity.<ref 
Orthodox theologians reject Augustine's formulation of original sin and actively oppose the content and implications of John Calvin's conceptions of total depravity and irresistible grace, characteristic of Reformed Protestantism, as well as the Thomistic and scholastic theology which would become official Roman Catholic pedagogy until the Second Vatican Council. Eastern Christians typically view scholasticism and similarly discursive, systematic theologies as rationalistic corruptions of the theology of the Cappadocian and early Desert Fathers that led the Western Church astray into heresy. Orthodoxy teaches that it is possible and necessary for the human will to cooperate with divine grace for the individual to be saved, or healed from the disease of sin. This cooperation is called synergism (see also semipelagianism and monergism), so that humans may become deified in conformity to the divine likeness – a process called theosis – by merging with the uncreated Energies of God (revealed to the senses as the Tabor Light of transfiguration), notably through a method of prayer called hesychasm.

Protestant Reformation
The Protestant Reformation reacted against the concepts of grace and merit as they were understood in late medieval Catholic theology.

Luther and Lutheran theology

Martin Luther's posting of his ninety-five theses to the church door in Wittenberg in 1517 was a direct consequence of the perfunctory sacramentalism and treasury doctrines of the medieval church. The act was precipitated by the arrival of Johann Tetzel, authorized by the Vatican to sell indulgences.

The effectiveness of these indulgences was predicated on the doctrine of the treasury of grace proclaimed by Pope Clement VI. The theory was that merit earned by acts of piety could augment the believer's store of sanctifying grace. Gifts to the Church were acts of piety. The Church, moreover, had a treasury full of grace above and beyond what was needed to get its faithful into heaven. The Church was willing to part with some of its surplus in exchange for earthly gold. Martin Luther's anger against this practice, which seemed to him to involve the purchase of salvation, began a swing of the pendulum back towards the Pauline vision of grace, as opposed to James's.

Luther taught that men were helpless and without a plea before God's justice, and their acts of piety were utterly inadequate before his infinite holiness. Were God  just, and not merciful, everyone would go to hell, because everyone, even the best of mankind, deserves to go to hell. Mankind's inability to achieve salvation by its own effort suggests that even the best intentions are somehow tainted by mankind's sinful nature. This doctrine is sometimes called total depravity, a term derived from Calvinism and its relatives.

It is by faith alone and by grace alone that men are saved. Good works are something the believers should undertake out of gratitude towards their Savior; but they are not sufficient for salvation and cannot earn anyone salvation; there is no room for the notion of "merit" in Luther's doctrine of redemption. (There may, however, be degrees of reward for the redeemed in heaven.) Only the unearned, unmerited grace of God can save anyone. No one can have a claim of entitlement to God's grace, and it is only by his generosity that salvation is even possible.

As opposed to the treasury of grace from which believers can make withdrawals, in Lutheranism salvation becomes a declaration of spiritual bankruptcy, in which penitents acknowledge the inadequacy of their own resources and trust only in God to save them. Accepting Augustine's concern for legal justification as the base metaphor for salvation, the believers are not so much made righteous in Lutheranism as they are considered covered by Christ's righteousness. Acknowledging that they have no power to make themselves righteous, the penalty for their sins is discharged because Jesus has already paid for it with his blood. His righteousness is credited to those who believe in and thus belong to him.

Calvin and Reformed theology
Calvin and Luther believed free will does not co-operate with God's grace which, according to them, cannot be rejected (see monergism). The Lutheran Augsburg Confession says of baptism, "Lutherans teach that it is necessary to salvation and that by baptism the grace of God is offered and that children are to be baptized, who by baptism, being offered to God, are received into God's favor." The French reformer John Calvin expanded and further developed these Augustinian themes in his systematic Institutes of the Christian Religion in 1536.

The logical structure of Calvinism is often expressed as an acronym. These five categories do not comprise Calvinism in its entirety. They simply encapsulate its central, definitive doctrines.

 Total depravity (also known as total inability, which is inexorably tied to a strong doctrine of original sin as having enslaved the human will completely)
 Unconditional election
 Limited Atonement (also known as definite atonement or particular redemption)
 Irresistible Grace
 Perseverance of the Saints (colloquially known as "once saved, always saved" or, as interpreted a distinct way among Reformed or Strict Baptists as well as non-Calvinist General Baptists, eternal security)

The notion that God has foreordained who will be saved is generally called predestination. The concept of predestination peculiar to Calvinism, "double-predestination", (in conjunction with limited atonement) is the most controversial expression of the doctrine. According to Reformed theology, the "good news" of the gospel of Christ is that God has freely granted the gift of salvation to those the Holy Spirit causes to believe; what he freely grants to some (the "elect" individuals), he withholds from others (the "reprobate" individuals).

Calvin sought to provide assurance to the faithful that God would actually save them. His teaching implied what came to be known as the doctrine of the perseverance of the saints, the notion that God would actually save those who were his Elect. The actual status and ultimate state of any man's soul were unknown except to God. When assurance of election was rigorously pressed as an experience to be sought, especially by the Puritans, this led to a legalism as rigid as the one Protestantism sought to reject, as men were eager to demonstrate that they were among the chosen by the conspicuous works-righteousness of their lives.

The relatively radical positions of Reformed theology provoked a strong reaction from both Roman Catholics and Lutherans.

Classical and Wesleyan Arminian theology 
In the beginning of the 17th century, the Dutch theologian James Arminius formulated Arminianism and departed from Calvin's theology in particular on election and predestination. Arminianism affirms the compatibility between human free will and divine foreknowledge, but its incompatibility with theological determinism. Predestination in Arminianism is based on divine foreknowledge, unlike in Calvinism. Thus, the offer of salvation through grace does not act irresistibly in a purely cause-effect, deterministic method but rather in an influence-and-response fashion that can be both freely accepted and freely denied. In Arminianism, God takes initiative in the salvation process and his grace comes to all people, based on Jesus unlimited atonement. This is done through prevenient grace which acts on all people to convince them of the Gospel, draw them strongly towards salvation, and enable the possibility of sincere faith. As Roger Olson put it: "[Arminius]' evangelical synergism reserves all the power, ability and efficacy in salvation to grace, but allows humans the God-granted ability to resist or not resist it. The only "contribution" humans make is nonresistance to grace."

Later, John Wesley also rejected the Calvinist doctrine of predestination, and had the same Arminian understanding as expressed in Wesleyan theology. It remains the standard teaching of Methodist churches. Wesley also appealed to prevenient grace, stating that God makes the initial move in salvation, but human beings are free to respond or reject God's graceful initiative. The doctrine of prevenient grace remains one of Methodism's most important doctrines.

John Wesley distinguished three kinds of divine grace in the process of salvation: 1. "Prevenient grace" which is an enabling grace preceding regeneration ("prevenient" means preceding). 2. "Justifying grace" which can bring regeneration but which is resistible. 3. "Sustaining grace" which helps a person to remain into regeneration, and to reach sanctification and final salvation. In particular Wesley taught that Christian believers are to participate in the means of grace and to continue to grow in the Christian life, assisted by God's sustaining grace.

The Protestant Reformation and ecclesiology
Protestantism in all three major schools of theology – Lutheran, Calvinist, and Arminian – emphasize God's initiative in the work of salvation, which is achieved by grace alone through faith alone, in either stream of thinking – although these terms are understood differently, according to the differences in systems.

Classical Calvinism teaches that the sacraments are "signs and seals of the covenant of grace" and "effectual means of salvation", and Lutheranism teaches that new life, faith, and union with Christ are granted by the Holy Spirit working through the sacraments. However, for a large portion of the Protestant world, the sacraments largely lost the importance that Luther (and to a slightly lesser degree, Calvin) attributed to them. This happened under the influence of ideas of the Anabaptists which were ideas also seen in the Donatists in North Africa in 311 AD, and these ideas then spread to Calvinists through the Congregationalist and Baptist movements, and to Lutherans through Pietism (although much of Lutheranism recoiled against the Pietist movement after the mid-19th century).

Where the sacraments are de-emphasized, they become "ordinances", acts of worship which are required by Scripture, but whose effect is limited to the voluntary effect they have on the worshipper's soul. This belief finds expression in the Baptist and Anabaptist practice of believer's baptism, given not to infants as a mark of membership in a Christian community, but to adult believers after they have achieved the age of reason and have professed their faith. These ordinances are never considered works-righteousness. The ritual as interpreted in light of such ideas does not at all bring about salvation, nor does its performance bring about the forgiveness of sins; the forgiveness which the believer has received by faith is merely pictured, not effectively applied, by baptism; salvation and participation in Christ is memorialized ("this do in remembrance of me" in the Lord's Supper and baptism picturing a Christian's rebirth as death to sin and alive in Christ), not imparted, by the Eucharist. The Church to the Baptists becomes an assembly of true believers in Christ Jesus who gather together for worship and fellowship and remembering what Christ did for them.

Churches of Christ

The Churches of Christ believe that the grace of God that saves is the plan of salvation, rather than salvation itself. This plan includes two parts, 1) the perfect life, death, burial, and resurrection of Jesus the Christ, 2) the gospel/New Testament/the faith.

Concerning Ephesians 2:8 which states: "For by grace are ye saved through faith; and that not of yourselves: it is the gift of God", it is noted that the word "it" is a pronoun and refers back to a noun. As the word "saved" is a verb, "it" does not refer to "saved" but to grace, giving the definition of grace as "the gift of God". Furthermore, as the Book of James distinguishes between a dead faith (a faith without works) and a living faith (a faith accompanied by works of obedience), it is believed that God's gift operates through an individuals living faith resulting in that individual being saved.

 Grace is contrasted with the Law of Moses (Romans 6:14; Hebrews 10:4; John 1:17) and the church of Christ believes that Paul's contrast between work and faith is as described under the Efforts to resolve the tension section, a contrast between works of the Old Covenant and obedient faith under the New Covenant.
 Grace saves (Ephesians 2:5); justifies (Romans 3:24; Titus 3:7).
 Grace can not be added to (Galatians 5:4).
 Grace teaches (Titus 2:11); can be preached (Ephesians 3:8).
 Grace calls mankind (2 Timothy 1:9; Galatians 1:15).
 Grace is brought by revelation (1 Peter 1:13).
 Grace and truth came by Jesus Christ (John 1:17)
 Grace is sufficient for mankind (2 Corinthians 12:9)

The Galatians were removed from the calling of the gospel (Galatians 1:6,7; 2 Thessalonians 2:14) unto another gospel (another message) which verse 7 says is not a gospel at all but a perversion.

The Church of Christ believes that grace provides the following plan, which, if followed, results in salvation:

 One must hear the gospel/word (Romans 10:17).
 Believe the gospel (Mark 16:15–16).
 Repent of their past sins (Acts 2:38).
 Confess their faith in Christ before men (Matthew 10:32; Romans 10:9–10).
 Be immersed in water into Christ for the remission of those sins (1 Peter 3:21; Romans 6:3–18; John 3:3,5; 1 John 5:6,8; Acts 2:38; Mark 16:16; etc.)
 Live faithfully even to the point of death (Revelation 2:10; Romans 11:17–22; James 5:19–20).

See also

 Prevenient grace
 Salvation (Christianity)
 Sacrament
 Charism
 Merit

Notes

References

Citations

Sources

Further reading

Orthodox 
 Bishop Kallistos (Ware), The Inner Kingdom: The Collected Works (St. Vladimir's Seminary, 2000) 
 The Way of a Pilgrim and A Pilgrim Continues on His Way, Olga Savin, trans. (Shambhala, 2001)

Roman Catholic

 Catholic Teaching on Sin & Grace (Center for Learning, 1997), 
 George Hayward Joyce, The Catholic Doctrine of Grace (Newman, 1950), 
 
 Stephen J. Duffy, The Graced Horizon: Nature and Grace in Modern Catholic Thought (HPAC, 1992),

Protestant
 Dietrich Bonhoeffer, The Cost of Discipleship, Fuller and Booth, trans. (Touchstone, 1995).
 John Calvin, "Institutes of the Christian Religion, Book 2 Chapter 4"
 
 Randy Maddox, Responsible Grace (Kingswood, 1994) 
 Alister McGrath, Iustitia Dei: A History of the Christian Doctrine of Justification (Cambridge, 1998) 
 Glen Pettigrove, "Forgiveness and Grace", in Forgiveness and Love (Oxford University Press, 2012) 124–150.
 R. C. Sproul, Grace Unknown: The Heart of Reformed Theology (Baker Book House, 1999) 
 Ulasien, Paul, The Power of a Grace Perspective  (Infinity, 2011) , 
 Philip Yancey, What's So Amazing About Grace? (Zondervan, 1997) 
 Paul F. M. Zahl, Grace in Practice: A Theology of Everyday Life (Eerdmans, 2007) 

 
Attributes of God in Christian theology
Christian soteriology
Christian terminology